Wuxi Big Bridge Experimental High School (Wuxi Big Bridge Academy), founded in 1993, is a private high school located in the downtown historical Xueqianjie neighborhood of Wuxi, Jiangsu Province, China.

The school served as an independent magnet school for selected students from the Wuxi region. The academic goal of the school is to provide selected students with a specialized education that emphasizes on the acquisition of knowledge and talent development. With the teachers’ efforts, graduates went off to top universities in the nation and around the world, which include, among many others, Qinghua, Peking, Fudan, and Nanjing in China, and Harvard, MIT, Cambridge, Oxford, and Amsterdam University College overseas.

Wuxi Big Bridge Experimental High School distinguishes itself as a preeminent education institution that instills its students with a lifetime commitment to learning, extraordinary character, and the confidence to excel in both global and local communities.

Wuxi Big Bridge Experimental High School also offers students opportunities to study in Hwa Chong Institution, Singapore after they finish 3 years of study.

See also
 Education in China

References

Buildings and structures in Wuxi
Educational institutions established in 1993
High schools in Jiangsu
Private schools in China
1993 establishments in China
Education in Wuxi